La double épreuve, ou Colinette à la cour, is a comédie lyrique (comic opera) in three acts written by André Grétry in 1782 to a French libretto by Jean-Baptiste Lourdet de Santerre, based on Charles Simon Favart's .

Performance history
It was first performed on 1 January 1782 by the Académie Royale de Musique (Paris Opera) at the Théâtre de la Porte-Saint-Martin, and included choreography by Maximilien Gardel.

Roles

References
Notes

Sources
 Original libretto: La Double Épreuve, ou Colinette à la cour, comédie lyrique en trois actes, Paris, De Lormel, 1782 (accessible online in books google)
 Bartlet, M Elizabeth C (1992), 'Grétry, André-Ernest-Modeste' (work-list) in The New Grove Dictionary of Opera, ed. Stanley Sadie (London) 
 Bibliographic summary
 André E. M. Grétry Opera Score Collection
 Pitou, Spire (1983–1990). The Paris Opéra: An Encyclopedia of Operas, Ballets, Composers, and Performers (3 volumes). Westport, Connecticut: Greenwood Press. .

Operas by André Grétry
Opéras comiques
Operas
French-language operas
1782 operas
Opera world premieres at the Paris Opera